Ricardo Triviño (born 15 February 1973) is a Mexican rally driver and multiple champion of NACAM Rally Championship.

In 2011 Triviño and his co-driver Marco Hernández got the first overall in La Carrera Panamericana in a Studebaker just 4.5 seconds ahead from the American driver Douglas Mockett.

Triviño competed in the 2012 season in PWRC category, he finished in 7th place with 52 points.

Racing record

Complete WRC results

PWRC results

WRC-2 results

WRC-3 results

* Season still in progress.

References
eWRC

Living people
Mexican rally drivers
World Rally Championship drivers
1973 births
Carrera Panamericana drivers